Richard Savage may refer to:

 Richard Savage (poet) (c. 1697–1743), English poet
 Richard Savage (cricketer) (born 1955), English cricketer
 Richard Akinwande Savage (1874–1935), physician, journalist and politician in Lagos, Nigeria
 Richard Gabriel Akinwande Savage (1903–1993), physician, soldier, and first person of West African heritage to receive a British Army commission
 Richard Henry Savage (1846–1903), American military officer and author
 Richard Savage, 4th Earl Rivers (c. 1654–1712)
 Rick Savage (born 1960), bassist with Def Leppard
 Richard Savage (1842), a novel by Charles Whitehead